Michael Vinay Bhatia (August 23, 1976 –May 7, 2008) was a researcher studying conflict resolution in war-torn countries. He was born in Upland, California. He attended Brown University, where he graduated magna cum laude with a B.A. in International Relations in 1999. He was the recipient of the Herbert Scoville Jr. Peace Fellowship and a Marshall Scholarship to study at the University of Oxford where he earned his M.Sc. in International Relations in 2002. He was a visiting fellow at the Watson Institute for International Studies at Brown University and a lecturer at Carleton University, Ottawa, Canada.

Bhatia was killed on May 7, 2008 in Khost Province, Afghanistan where he was serving as a social scientist in consultation with the US Defense Department. On May 16, 2008, by order of Robert Gates, the Secretary of Defense of the United States, Bhatia was awarded the Secretary of Defense Medal for the Defense of Freedom posthumously.

Research and work
Bhatia's work concentrated on conflict resolution in war-torn countries. His research and humanitarian work brought him to the Sahrawi refugee camps in western Algeria, East Timor, Kosovo, and Afghanistan.

Besides published works (see below) which Bhatia wrote and edited, he was working on a doctoral dissertation, "The Mujahideen: A Study of Combatant Motives in Afghanistan, 1978–2004" when he died.

Bhatia's field work had taken him to Khost Province, where he was working on resolutions to inter-tribal conflicts concerning land rights as part of the pilot Human Terrain System (HTS) program with the U.S. Army's 82d Airborne Division.

It has been estimated by US military personnel that Bhatia's Human Terrain Team helped one brigade reduce its killings by 60 to 70%, increase the number of districts supporting the Afghan government from 15 to 83, and reduce Afghan civilian deaths from over 70 during the previous brigade's tour to 11.

Bhatia's human terrain studies, work, and his death are the subject of part three in the documentary Human Terrain: War Becomes Academic, directed by James Der Derian.

Death
Bhatia was assigned to the Afghanistan Human Terrain Team #1, in support of Task Force Currahee based at Forward Operating Base Salerno, Khost Province. His team was making an initial mission into a remote area of Khost province where they intended to initiate a negotiation process between tribes. He was killed when the Humvee he was riding in was struck by an improvised explosive device (IED). Two soldiers from Task Force Currahee were also killed in the attack, and two others were critically injured.

Commentary

List of works
 
  
 
  "Shooting Afghanistan: Beyond the Conflict" (2008, photo-essay)
 "The peace allergy: why the U.S. military had no plans for post-war Iraq", Bulletin of the Atomic Scientists, July 1, 2003, Foundation for Nuclear Science, Inc., Vol. 59, Issue 4, page 52 (8)
 "Sins of omission: the AJC's project interchange and the creation of American opinion. (American Jewish Committee)", Middle East Policy, September 1, 2002, Middle East Policy Council, Vol. 9, Issue 3, page 98 (7)
 "Postconflict profit: the political economy of intervention", Global Governance, April 1, 2005, Lynne Rienner Publishers, Vol. 11, Issue 2, page 205 (20)

Notes

References
 Brown Alumni Monthly, "A Belief in the Possible", Brown Alumni Monthly, Vol. 108, No. 6, July/August 2008, pp. 32–37. Retrieved on September 22, 2008.
 Geller, Adam, "Odyssey Took Man From Campus To Combat", Arizona Republic (Associated Press), March 8, 2009, p. 1.
 Geller, Adam, "Professor Pays Ultimate Price In Country He Loved", Arizona Republic (Associated Press), March 9, 2009, p. 1.
 Glenn, David, "Scholars Mourn a Colleague Who Lost His Life in Afghanistan", The Chronicle of Higher Education, 24 June 2008.

External links
 US Army Human Terrain System
 Michael Bhatia's Citation for the Secretary of Defense Medal for the Defense of Freedom
 Statement Regarding Loss of Employee from BAE SYSTEMS
 Statement Regarding Loss of US Army Training and Doctrine Command civilian contractor
 

1976 births
2008 deaths
American people of the War in Afghanistan (2001–2021)
Recipients of the Secretary of Defense Medal for the Defense of Freedom
Brown University alumni
Alumni of the University of Oxford